The 1996 SEABA Under-18 Championship was the qualifying tournament for Southeast Asia Basketball Association at the 1996 ABC Under-18 Championship. This was the maiden tournament for SEABA Under-18 Championship and was held in Santa Cruz, Laguna, Philippines from July 27 to 30. The games were scheduled to open on July 26 but was postponed due to floods caused by Typhoon Gloria (Gloring).

The Philippines swept all of their assignments en route to their maiden title by thrashing Singapore in the finals, 93–64. Both finalists joined 1996 ABC Under-18 Championship hosts Malaysia and Thailand to represent SEABA subzone.

Round robin

Final round

Third place match

Final

Final standings

Awards

References

SEABA Under-18 Championship
1996–97 in Asian basketball
1996 in Philippine basketball
International basketball competitions hosted by the Philippines